Julie Ann Taylor (born January 29, 1966 in Orange County, California) is an American voice actress who is best known for her role of Ai Tanabe in Planetes, Mutsumi Otohime in Love Hina, Yukari Hayasaka in Paradise Kiss and Taiga Fujimura in Fate/stay night among others. She is also credited as Julie Pickering, Jean Howard and Cricket Brown.

Filmography

Anime
 Ai Yori Aoshi~Enishi~ - Natsuki Komiya
 Aldnoah.Zero - Darzana Magbaredge
 Argento Soma - Amian, Joan
 Battle Athletes Victory - Pootashko
 Beyblade Burst Rise - Rogia Koryu (Ep. 1)
 Blade of the Immortal - Otatsu, Haya, Kagehisa Anotsu (Young)
 BlazBlue Alter Memory - Kokonoe, Tsubaki Yayoi
 Bleach - Lirin, Rin Tsubokura, Haineko (spirit), Nozomi Kujō, Jackie Tristan
 Blood Lad - Officer Beros, Wolf (Young)
 Bludgeoning Angel Dokuro-Chan - Minami
 Blue Exorcist - Exorcist B (Ep. 10), Female Student (Ep. 3), Kashino (Ep. 6), Teacher (Ep. 13)
 Burn Up Scramble - Rio Kinezono
 Carried by the Wind: Tsukikage Ran - Stephanie
 Code Geass - Milly Ashford
 El Hazard - Ifurita, Kalia
 Fate/stay night - Taiga Fujimura, Mordred (Ep. 21)
 Fate/stay night: Unlimited Blade Works - Taiga Fujimura
 Fafner in the Azure - Sakura Kaname
 Figure 17 - Asuka Karasawa, Narrator
 FLCL: Progressive - Hinae Hibajiri
 Gad Guard - Takumi Kisaragi
 Gankutsuou: The Count of Monte Cristo - Heloise, Additional Voices
 Gargantia on the Verdurous Planet - Bellows
 Gate Keepers - Reiko Asagiri
 Ghost in the Shell: Stand Alone Complex - Ran, Additional Voices
 Ghost Slayers Ayashi - Atl
 Grenadier - The Senshi of Smiles - Mikan Kurenai, Kasumi
 Gungrave - Biscoe's Wife, Randy's Wife
 Gun Frontier - Katrina, Ayame
 Hand Maid May - Additional Voices
 Hare+Guu - Hiroko Yamada
 Heat Guy J - Phia, Clair Leonelli (Young), Teto
 Here is Greenwood - Shun Kisaragi
 Honey and Clover - Ayumi Yamada
 Hunter × Hunter 2011 series – Khara
 Hyper Doll - Mica Minazuki
 Immortal Grand Prix - P.A. Announcer
 JoJo's Bizarre Adventure: Stardust Crusaders - Holly Kujo
 Kannazuki no Miko - Makoto
 Karas - Hinaru
 Kurokami: the Animation - Akane Sano
 Kuromukuro - Mirasa, Carrie Dunham
 Last Exile - Sophia Forrester
 Le Portrait de Petit Cossette - Shoko Mataki
 Love Hina - Mutsumi Otohime
 Love Hina Again - Mutsumi Otohime
 Love Live! School Idol Project - Cotaro Yazawa
 Lucky ☆ Star - Yui Narumi
 Lunar Legend Tsukihime - Akiha Tohno
 Mahoromatic - Eimi Shiina
 Magi: The Labyrinth of Magic - Seishun Li, Laila (Ep. 6), Alibaba (Young)
 Mao-chan - Operator
 Marmalade Boy - Doris O'Connor
 Mobile Suit Gundam: Iron-Blooded Orphans - Fumitan Admoss (Ep. 1 - 16)
 Monster - Lotte Frank, Johan (Young)
 Nura: Rise of the Yokai Clan series - Sasami, 12 Year Old Umewakamaru (Young Gyuki), Awashima (Season 2)
 Omishi Magical Theater: Risky Safety - Moe Katsuragi
 One-Punch Man - Split-Chinned Kid
 Overman King Gainer - Lioubov Smettana
 Paradise Kiss - Yukari "Caroline" Hayasaka
 Persona 4: The Animation - Ai Ebihara
 Planetes - Ai Tanabe
 Please Teacher! - Ichigo Morino, Kozue Kusanagi
 Please Twins! - Ichigo Morino
 Rozen Maiden - Souseiseki
 Rurouni Kenshin - Tsubaki, Misanagi
 S-CRY-ed - Chuka, Fani
 Sailor Moon - Haruna Sakurada, Viluy (Viz dub)
 Sailor Moon Crystal - Haruna Sakurada
 Saiyuki Reload - Gojyo (Young), Kanan, Rinlan, Wong
 Samurai Champloo - Shino
 Samurai Girl Real Bout High School - Shiroi Goto, Tomoe Kusunagi
 Space Pirate Captain Harlock - Kei Yuuki
 Scrapped Princess - Cz
 Stellvia - Ayaka Machida
 Sword Art Online II - Natsuki Aki, Skuld (Ep. 17)
 Sword Art Online Alicization - Natsuki Aki
 Tengen Toppa Gurren Lagann - Boota
 Tenjho Tenge - Chiaki Kounoke
 Tiger & Bunny - Mari (Ep. 9), Additional Voices
 Trigun - Additional Voices
 The Twelve Kingdoms - Haku Sanshi, Kei Kei
 Vandread - Meia Gisborn
 Witch Hunter Robin - Eiko Yano, Mika Hanamura
 X: The Series - Hokuto Sumeragi and Tohru Magami
 Zegapain - Tomigai and Fosetta (Ai)
 Zetman - Youko Amagi

Animation
 Enchantimals: Spring into Harvest Hills - Felicity Fox
 Enchantimals: Secrets of Snowy Valley - Felicity Fox

Movies
 Adventures in Voice Acting - Herself
 Ah! My Goddess: The Movie - Additional Voices
 Akira - Additional Voices (2001 Pioneer dub)
 Eureka Seven: Good Night, Sleep Tight, Young Lovers - Renton Thurston (Young)
 Fate/stay night: Heaven's Feel I. presage flower - Taiga Fujimura
 The Flu - Kim In-hae (Soo Ae)
 Oblivion Island: Haruka and the Magic Mirror - Haruka's Mother
 Mobile Suit Gundam F91 - Monica Arno
 Patlabor: The Movie - Noa Izumi
 Patlabor 2: The Movie - Noa Izumi
 Puella Magi Madoka Magica Movie 3: Rebellion - Junko Kaname
 Sakura Wars: The Movie - Lachette Altair

Video games
 .hack//Infection - Rachel
.hack//Mutation - Rachel
.hack//Outbreak - Rachel
.hack//Quarantine - Rachel
BlazBlue series - Tsubaki Yayoi, Kokonoe, Izayoi
Danganronpa 2: Goodbye Despair - Ibuki Mioda
Danganronpa V3: Killing Harmony - Tenko Chabashira
Eternal Sonata - Falsetto
Fire Emblem Awakening - Cordelia, Severa
Fire Emblem Fates - Flora, Selena, Caeldori
Fire Emblem Heroes - Linde, Nephenee, Cordelia, Severa, Selena, Flora, Caeldori
Fire Emblem Warriors - Linde, Cordelia
Nier - Emil (uncredited)
Nier: Automata - Emil
Nier Replicant ver.1.22474487139... - Emil, No. 7
One-Punch Man: A Hero Nobody Knows - Split-Chinned Kid
Persona 4 - Ai Ebihara (uncredited)
Re:Zero − Starting Life in Another World: The Prophecy of the Throne - Tivey Pearlbaton
Rune Factory 5 - Beatrice
Sakura Wars: So Long, My Love - Ratchet Altair
Shenmue III - Additional Cast
Shira Oka: Second Chances - Alice
Star Ocean: Second Evolution - Chisato Madison
Tales of Vesperia - Karol Capel (uncredited)
The Legend of Heroes: Trails of Cold Steel IV - Josette Capua
Soulcalibur IV - Hildegard von Krone
Soulcalibur: Broken Destiny - Hildegard von Krone
Soulcalibur V - Hildegard von Krone
Soulcalibur VI - Hildegard von Krone
Xenoblade Chronicles X - Additional voices

References

External links

1966 births
Living people
American voice actresses
Actresses from California
20th-century American actresses
21st-century American actresses
American video game actresses
People from Los Angeles
American television actresses
University of California, Los Angeles alumni